Road Rules: Viewers' Revenge is the fourteenth and final season of the MTV reality television series Road Rules. The season premiered on January 30, 2007, at 9:00 pm EST/PST and ran through May 9, 2007. The cast is made up of six former Road Rulers and ten "Pit Crew" members. This is the first MTV reality show to be filmed and then aired in near real time with input from viewers at home.

The cast drove around California, Arizona, and Nevada competing in various missions. Each mission earned a prize of $10,000 to be pooled and split by the six cast members who made it to the finale. In addition to the cash prize, individual cast members won a Mazda3.

This season brought several changes, most notably the requirement for some to face-off against pit crew members for the right to stay on the RV. The cast was also given money and filming was not done on an ongoing schedule. This season also included new sponsorships from Wendy's and Mazda.

While this season was originally touted as bringing Road Rules out of hiatus, there have been no further seasons of Road Rules since.

Production details
In 2004, after its 13th season had wrapped, the show had not been renewed by MTV and the production company of Road Rules officially stated that the show was "on hiatus". For the better part of two years, Bunim/Murray Productions lobbied to have the show's contract renewed, failing twice. Ultimately in 2006, Bunim-Murray Productions had announced that they were retooling the show to include an "interactive" portion of the series as part of a new section of their company. Viewers had input in the cast eliminations, and elimination face-offs aired exclusively as digital elements on mtv.com. In late 2006, MTV announced they were picking up the series once again, resulting in Viewers' Revenge. The season's working title was Road Rules 360.

Original cast

Alumni 

MTV revealed the group of alumni who were invited back to participate on Monday, January 8, 2007. The group includes:

Pit Crew
In addition, eight new cast members were brought on to compete with the alumni for spots on the RV. Two others, Derek and Mike, later joined this group. Derek joined after Abram was kicked off, opening up a spot in the total cast. The additional new cast members are called the "Pit Crew". The cast members who comprised the original "Pit Crew" are:

Rotating Cast

 The contestant was sent to the Pit Crew
 The contestant was nominated to the Elimination Pit
 The contestant was sent home from the show
 The contestant was supposed to go into pit but spared because of another contestants Disqualification

 The contestant won a spot on the RV
 The contestant was nominated to the Elimination Pit
 There is no longer a Pit Crew member.

The Game

Rules
Rather than embarking on their trip several months before the air date, this show is being filmed and then broadcast in near real time. Cast members will only have the opportunity to compete in missions and nominate cast members for elimination. Viewers at home will be able to decide most other elements of the game from the MTV website.

The rules of Viewers' Revenge state after each mission, the group nominates one male and one female. The three male cast members are responsible for nominating the female. The three female cast members are responsible for nominating the male. Then viewers at home choose who, of those two people, will have to go into an elimination face-off. If they lose the face-off, the cast member will be replaced by one of the eight-member "Pit Crew." The replacement will be voted on by internet visitors to the MTV.com website. Voted off cast members are eligible to come back on the RV. After a cast member is voted off, they go back to the "Pit Crew".

Also, if the group loses two missions in a row, they must nominate two males and two females for an elimination face-off.

On episode three, due to Abram getting kicked off, it was announced only one castmember would be placed in the elimination pit, so long as the Roadies win their mission. If they lose their mission, they have to nominate two castmembers to the elimination pit.

On the final episode, David was booted from not only the RV but the show for sending unaired information to outside viewers which was a severe rule violation, saving Adam, who was nominated that day for the pit.

Episodes

: The Roadies are exempt from nominating a cast member to the Pit due to Abram's elimination.
 The group failed the mission
 The group won the mission

Webisodes 

: The Roadies are exempt from nominating a cast member to the Pit due to Abram's elimination.
: The Roadies are exempt from nominating a male cast member to the Pit due to David's elimination.
 The contestant went to the Elimination Pit and won
 The contestant went to the Elimination Pit and lost

After filming

Tori Hall married Brad Fiorenza on April 12, 2010. They have two children: John Brady Fiorenza (born on August 4, 2011) and Chase Fiorenza (born on January 13, 2015). The couple divorced in 2016. Hall then married lawyer Dusty Gwinn on October 23, 2020. In 2021, Hall announced she was expecting her third child. Christian Dean Gwinn was born on September 26, 2021.

David Leach moved to Los Angeles and is currently pursuing an acting career.

LaMonte Ponder is a choreographer in Atlanta and appeared in an episode on The Real World: Atlanta.

Flatley later was a contestant on Bromance in 2008. He died in 2014.

The Challenge

Challenge in bold indicates that the contestant was a finalist on The Challenge.

References

External links
Official Road Rules Website
Real World/Road Rules Blog - News and Recaps
 

Road Rules
2007 American television seasons
Television shows filmed in California
Television shows filmed in Arizona
Television shows shot in the Las Vegas Valley